Ruboc Lake is a very small lake in Kosovo. Robovac Lake is completely surrounded by the mountains of Gollak. It is the smallest lake in eastern Kosovo being about the same size as an average mountain lake.

References 

Lakes of Kosovo